Intersex people are born with sex characteristics, such as genitals, gonads and chromosome patterns, "that do not fit typical binary notions of male or female bodies". Literary descriptions may use older or different language for intersex traits, including describing intersex people as hermaphrodites, neither wholly male or female, or a combination of male and female. This page examines intersex characters in fictional works as a whole, focusing on characters and tropes over time.

For more information about fictional characters in other parts of the LGBTQ community, see the corresponding pages about asexual, pansexual, non-binary, lesbian, and gay characters in fiction.

Intersex characters and tropes

Intersex people have been portrayed in literature, television and film as monsters, murderers and medical dilemmas. Characters in award-winning literature include Cal Stephanides in the novel Middlesex by Jeffrey Eugenides, Max Walker in the novel Golden Boy by Abigail Tarttelin and Anjum in the novel The Ministry of Utmost Happiness by Arundhati Roy. 

Morgan Holmes, Canadian sociologist and a former activist with the (now defunct) Intersex Society of North America, comments on constructions of intersex people as monsters or ciphers for discussions about sex and gender. Holmes describes her weariness "of writers who had contacted me for a number of years during my intersex-activist days, trying to determine if their proposed ‘hermaphrodites’ could do things like impregnate or have sex with themselves",  and how depictions of intersex people are "stalled", reifying "the proper place of traditional visions and modes of masculinity in opposition to femininity" or "beyond and outside the realm of gender altogether"; the character of Annabel/Wayne, in the Canadian novel Annabel by Kathleen Winter, provides an example of monstrous auto-impregnation.

An intersex murderer plot twist trope has been repeated in the TV programs Nip/Tuck (Quentin Costa), Passions (Vincent Clarkson) and Janet King. This has been criticised as hackneyed and offensive, characterizing intersex people as deceitful.

Examples of the medical dilemmas trope include the 2010 Childrens Hospital episode "Show Me on Montana", the 2012 Emily Owens, M.D. episode "Emily and... the Question of Faith", a 2009 episode of House entitled, "The Softer Side", and Masters of Sex episode 3 in season 2, "Fight".

The MTV series Faking It marked the first intersex series regular in a TV show, Lauren Cooper, and also the first intersex character played by an intersex person, Raven. MTV worked with intersex civil society organization interACT on Faking It; the program was praised for creating a groundbreaking character. A Freaks and Geeks story has also been credited as commendable. In film, the character Rebeca Duarte in the movie Both was created by an intersex woman, Lisett Barcellos.

Prominent examples
Apart from the above-mentioned characters, there are various characters that stand out apart from the rest and are more prominent. One of those is Luca Esposito in Astra Lost in Space, the manga and anime of the same name. He is an artist and talented engineer on board the Astra, who was raised as and mostly identifies as a boy, and comes out as intersex halfway through the story, in the episode "Secret," not considering himself a man or a woman. His characteristics imply he most likely has Klinefelter's or a milder type of Androgen Insensitivity Syndrome, and was described by Michele Liu of Anime News Network as "unique" since Luca is a main character which is born intersex rather than "altered by sci-fi space diseases or external influence," with Liu also describing Luca as bisexual. While there were intersex characters like Ryo Asuka in Devilman Crybaby and Izana Shinatose in Knights of Sidonia, there are three other series with notable characters. They are Crimvael "Crim" in the controversial series Interspecies Reviewers, Iena Madaraba in Seton Academy: Join the Pack!, Ruby Moon in Cardcaptor Sakura, and Stevonnie in Steven Universe. Crim is a well-endowed intersex angel with a broken halo, that has male and female genitalia, as noted throughout the series. Despite his feminine appearance, he chooses to identify as male upon meeting Stunk & Zel in the first episode, to avoid them trying anything perverted on him. As for Iena, also known as Yena, she is a spotted hyena with male genitalia and is confused about her true gender & sexuality. Although she later finds out that she is biologically female, she still allows others to refer to her with either gender pronoun in episodes such as "The Wild Habits of a Troubled Animal." Ruby, on the other hand, has no biological sex. and Stevonnie, a fusion of both Steven and Connie, has a gender which is difficult to describe, Series creator Rebecca Sugar describes it as the "living relationship between Steven and Connie." Stevonnie is commonly referred to with gender neutral pronouns (such as the singular they), while male and female characters seem to be physically attracted to Stevonnie.

Comics have their own intersex characters as well. For instance, Comet, and Comet later began relationship with Blithe, since she loved both their forms (revealing that Blithe is bisexual). Desire, and  Rebis are intersex. Additionally Richard Plantagenet, later Richard III of England in Requiem of the Rose King and  Ystina, the Shining Knight in Demon Knights are as well. One prominent character is Aggie in Go Get a Roomie!. In this comic, which explores sexual themes, Aggie, Roomie's past lover, reveals she was born intersex in a radio interview.

While there are very few intersex characters in film, specifically Rebeca Duarte in  Both, Alex Kraken in XXY and Spork in Spork there are various intersex characters in literature. This includes Cornelius Brunner in The Final Programme the protagonist in 2312 named Swan Er Hong, Ilario in Ilario, A Story of the First History, and Kirsten Lattimer in None of the Above. Also, Bel Thorne
in the Vorkosigan Saga and Max Walker in Golden Boy are intersex, to give two examples.

See also 
 Films about intersex
 Timeline of intersex history 
 Literature about intersex
 Television works about intersex
 List of intersex people
 List of fictional polyamorous characters
 List of animated series with LGBT characters
 Lists of LGBT figures in fiction and myth

References

 
Intersex in society